Offerle is a city in Edwards County, Kansas, United States.  As of the 2020 census, the population of the city was 179.

History
Offerle was founded in 1876. It was named for Lawrence Offerle, one of its founders.

The first post office in Offerle was established in May, 1876.

Geography
Offerle is located at  (37.891067, -99.559646).

Climate
The climate in this area is characterized by hot, humid summers and generally mild to cool winters.  According to the Köppen Climate Classification system, Offerle has a humid subtropical climate, abbreviated "Cfa" on climate maps.

Demographics

2010 census
As of the census of 2010, there were 199 people, 83 households, and 58 families residing in the city. The racial makeup of the city was 91.5% White, 3.0% Native American, and 5.5% from other races. Hispanic or Latino of any race were 13.6% of the population.

There were 83 households, of which 27.7% had children under the age of 18 living with them, 65.1% were married couples living together, 1.2% had a female householder with no husband present, 3.6% had a male householder with no wife present, and 30.1% were non-families. 25.3% of all households were made up of individuals, and 10.8% had someone living alone who was 65 years of age or older. The average household size was 2.40 and the average family size was 2.91.

The median age in the city was 43.4 years. 23.6% of residents were under the age of 18; 4.9% were between the ages of 18 and 24; 23.5% were from 25 to 44; 30.5% were from 45 to 64; and 17.1% were 65 years of age or older. The gender makeup of the city was 45.2% male and 54.8% female.

2000 census
As of the census of 2000, there were 220 people, 86 households, and 65 families residing in the city. The racial makeup of the city was 99.09% White, 0.45% from other races, and 0.45% from two or more races. Hispanic or Latino of any race were 2.27% of the population.

There were 86 households, out of which 27.9% had children under the age of 18 living with them, 68.6% were married couples living together, 3.5% had a female householder with no husband present, and 24.4% were non-families. 23.3% of all households were made up of individuals, and 12.8% had someone living alone who was 65 years of age or older. The average household size was 2.56 and the average family size was 3.03.

In the city, the population was spread out, with 24.1% under the age of 18, 9.5% from 18 to 24, 26.8% from 25 to 44, 20.9% from 45 to 64, and 18.6% who were 65 years of age or older. The median age was 40 years. For every 100 females, there were 107.5 males. For every 100 females age 18 and over, there were 103.7 males.

The median income for a household in the city was $40,208, and the median income for a family was $41,250. Males had a median income of $30,313 versus $23,125 for females. The per capita income for the city was $14,549. About 3.6% of families and 7.6% of the population were below the poverty line, including 15.6% of those under the age of eighteen and 9.1% of those 65 or over.

Education
Offerle is served by USD 347 Kinsley-Offerle Public Schools.

Offerle High School was closed through school unification. The Offerle High School mascot was Indians.

References

External links
 Offerle - Directory of Public Officials
 USD 347, local school district
 Offerle COOP
 Offerle city map, EdwardsCounty.org
 Offerle city map, KDOT

Cities in Kansas
Cities in Edwards County, Kansas